The Friars Club  is a private club in New York City. Famous for its risqué roasts, the club's membership is composed mostly of comedians and other celebrities. Founded in 1904, it is located at 57 East 55th Street, between Park Avenue and Madison Avenue, in the historic Martin Erdmann House (now known as the Monastery).

History

Early years
The organization traces its roots to 1904, when representatives of the Broadway theaters working with New York publicists organized the Press Agents' Association to exchange lists of people who were fraudulently receiving complimentary passes to shows. The group regularly met at Browne's Chop House. Shortly thereafter it began its tribute dinners to theatrical celebrities, the first being Clyde Fitch. The impresario Oscar Hammerstein was toasted in 1908, the year in which the Friars moved into a clubhouse at 107 West 47th Street.

The first Friars Frolics were held in 1911, with Abbot George M. Cohan working with Will Rogers, Irving Berlin (who wrote "Alexander's Ragtime Band" for the event), and Victor Herbert; the money generated by the Frolics enabled them to purchase 106-108-110 West 48th Street. Under Abbot Cohan it laid a cornerstone on the building in 1915. In 1924, Walter Donaldson wrote the music for "My Blue Heaven" one afternoon while waiting in the club for his turn at the billiard table.

Roasting
In 1950 Sam Levenson and fellow comedian Joe E. Lewis were the first members of the New York Friars Club to be roasted. The club has roasted a member every year since the inaugural roasting.

Between 1998 and 2002, the club's roasts were aired on Comedy Central, which then began organizing its own annual roasts.

Current location
The Friars Club moved into its current headquarters in 1957, an English Renaissance mansion built for Speyer & Company investment banker Martin Erdmann by architects Alfredo S. G. Taylor and Levi in 1908. Friars Club roasts were first televised in the late 1960s, first as part of the Kraft Music Hall series. From 1998 to 2002, Comedy Central broadcast the roasts.

In 1999, Cinemax aired Let Me In, I Hear Laughter: A Salute to the Friars Club directed by Dean Ward. It featured previously unseen footage of roasts and interviews with Friars such as Milton Berle, Buddy Hackett, Sid Caesar, Steve Allen, Henny Youngman, Jeffrey Ross, Larry King, Ed McMahon, and Phyllis Diller.

In 2008, the Friars Club began a stand-up comedy competition, "So You Think You Can Roast!?" On October 24 of that year, the winner performed at the Friars Club roast of Matt Lauer. The inaugural Friars Club Comedy Film Festival was held in September 2009, opening with the American premiere of the Coen Brothers' A Serious Man.

In 2013, the New York City Landmarks Preservation Commission proposed designating the Martin Erdmann House as a New York City landmark. The clubhouse was designated as a landmark on November 22, 2016.

Organization 
Frederick F. Schrader is credited with suggesting "Friars" as the organization's name. Following the theme, their monthly newsletter is the Epistle. Officers of the Club (as distinct from the Friars Foundation) are given monastic titles: Larry King was the dean, Freddie Roman was the Dean Emeritus. Jerry Lewis was the Abbot, named in 2006 during a roast in New York City. Previous abbots have included Alan King, Frank Sinatra, Ed Sullivan and George M. Cohan.

In the 1960s, the Friars Club, the Lambs Club, and the Players Club were often confused. The columnist Earl Wilson put it this way in 1964: "Long ago a New Yorker asked the difference between the Lambs, Friars, and Players, since the membership was, at the time, predominantly from Broadway." It was left to "a wit believed to have been George S. Kaufman" to draw the distinction: "The Players are gentlemen trying to be actors, the Lambs are actors trying to be gentlemen, and the Friars are neither trying to be both."

List of roasts

 1950
 Sam Levenson
 1951
 Phil Silvers
 Harry Delf
 Mel Allen
 1952
 Leo Durocher
 Rocky Marciano
 1953
 Sophie Tucker
 Milton Berle
 Eddie Fisher
 1954
 Red Buttons
 Martha Raye
 Ed Sullivan, roastmaster Jack Carter
 1955
 Humphrey Bogart, roastmaster Red Buttons
 1956
 Sammy Davis Jr.
 1957
 Joe E. Lewis
 1958
 Red Buttons
 1959
 Milton Berle, roastmaster Jack E. Leonard
 Jimmy Cannon, roastmaster Jack E. Leonard
 Jack E. Leonard
 1960
 George Burns, roastmaster George Jessel
 1961
 Lucille Ball, roastmaster Johnny Carson
 Alan King, roastmaster Jack E. Leonard
 1962
 Jan Murray
 Johnny Carson
 1963
 Steve Lawrence
 Jack Benny
 1964
 Jack Carter
 Nat "King" Cole
 Sammy Davis Jr.
 1965
 Marty Allen and Steve Rossi
 Soupy Sales
 1966
 Al Kelly
 John V. Lindsay
 1967
 Milton Berle
 1968
 Harry Belafonte
 Don Rickles, roastmaster Jack E. Leonard 
 Johnny Carson, roastmaster Alan King
 1969
 Barbra Streisand
 Jack E. Leonard
 1970
 Don Rickles, roastmaster Johnny Carson (confirmed) 
 David Frost
 Jack Benny, roastmaster Johnny Carson
 1971
 Jerry Lewis, roastmaster Johnny Carson
 Phil Silvers
 Pat Henry
 1972
 Ed McMahon
 1973
 Henny Youngman
 1974
 George Raft
 Milton Berle
 1975
 Redd Foxx
 1976
 Telly Savalas
 1977
 Joey Adams, roastmaster Milton Berle
 Totie Fields

 1978
 Neil Simon, roastmaster Milton Berle
 1979
 Robert Merrill
 Norm Crosby, roastmaster Milton Berle
 1980
 George Steinbrenner
 1981
 Jim Dale
 1982
 Dick Shawn, roastmaster Buddy Hackett
 1983
 Sid Caesar, roastmaster Buddy Hackett
 Roger Grimsby
 1984
 Chuck Scarborough
 Rolland Smith
 1985
 Phyllis Diller, roastmaster Buddy Hackett
 1986
 Jerry Lewis, roastmaster Buddy Hackett
 1987
 Rich Little, roastmaster Norm Crosby
 1988
 Ernest Borgnine
 1989
 Bruce Willis, roastmaster Milton Berle
 1990
 Chevy Chase, roastmaster Dan Aykroyd
 1991
 Richard Pryor, roastmaster Robin Williams
 1992
 Billy Crystal, roastmaster Rob Reiner
 1993
 Whoopi Goldberg, roastmaster Ted Danson
 1994
 Bob Newhart, roastmaster Don Rickles
 1995
 Steven Seagal, roastmaster Milton Berle
 1996
 Kelsey Grammer, roastmaster David Hyde Pierce
 1997
 Danny Aiello, roastmaster Joy Behar
 1998
 Drew Carey, roastmaster Ryan Stiles
 1999
 Jerry Stiller, roastmaster Jason Alexander
 2000
 Rob Reiner, roastmaster Michael McKean
 2001
 Hugh Hefner, roastmaster Jimmy Kimmel
 2002
 Chevy Chase, roastmaster Paul Shaffer
 2003 
 The Smothers Brothers, roastmaster Susie Essman (replacing Richard Belzer)
 2004
 Donald Trump, roastmaster Regis Philbin
 2005
 Don King, roastmaster Donald Trump
 2006
 Jerry Lewis, roastmaster Richard Belzer
 2007
 Pat Cooper, roastmaster Lisa Lampanelli
 2008
 Matt Lauer, roastmaster Al Roker
 2010
 Quentin Tarantino, roastmaster Samuel L. Jackson
 2012
 Betty White, roastmaster Barbara Walters
 2013
 Jack Black, roastmaster Bob Saget
 2014
 Boomer Esiason, roastmaster Jeff Garlin 
 2015 
 Terry Bradshaw, roastmaster Joel McHale

Friars Club Comedy Film Festival 
In its debut year, the festival featured the US premiere of the Coen brothers’ Academy Award–nominated film A Serious Man. Other festival highlights include screenings of Lena Dunham’s Tiny Furniture, Christopher Morris’s Four Lions, and the Oscar-winning short God of Love. In 2011, Jerry Lewis and Russel Simmons presented a comedy achievement award to Brett Ratner. In 2012, the festival hosted America Ferrera and David Cross, stars of the opening film It's a Disaster. According to The Wall Street Journal, "The festival has quietly become one of the city's most sharply curated cinema gatherings. It takes the funny business seriously."

See also
 Friars Club of California, founded in 1947 as a spinoff
 List of New York City Designated Landmarks in Manhattan from 14th to 59th Streets

References

External links 
 
 So You Think You Can Roast?, presented by the Friars Club
 Friars Club Comedy Film Festival 
 100 Years Of Laughs: Comedians Yuk It Up For Friars Club Centennial, a June 2004 CBS News story

Roast (comedy)
Gentlemen's clubs in New York City
1904 establishments in New York City
Organizations established in 1904
Festival organizations in North America
Film festivals in New York City
Midtown Manhattan
New York City Designated Landmarks in Manhattan